Kentucky Wesleyan College (KWC) is a private Methodist college in Owensboro, Kentucky. Fall 2018 enrollment was 830 students.

History

Kentucky Wesleyan College was founded in 1858 by the Kentucky Conference of the Methodist Episcopal Church. It was originally located in rural Millersburg, Kentucky. Classes began in 1866 and the first commencement took place in 1868. At first, it was a training school for preachers, but soon business and liberal arts classes were added to the curriculum. 

In 1890, the school was moved to Winchester and soon after, women began to be admitted for the first time. In 1951, the school moved to its present location in Kentucky's fourth largest city, Owensboro.

Presidents
College presidents include:

1. Charles Taylor (1866–1870)
Interim A.G. Murphy (1869–1870)
2. Benjamin Arbogast (1870–1873)
3. John Darby (1873–1875)
4. Thomas J. Dodd (1875–1876)
5. William H. Anderson (1876–1879)
6. David W. Batson (1879–1883)
7. Alexander Redd (1883–1884)
8. David W. Batson (1884–1893)
9. Benjamin T. Spencer (1893–1895)
10. Eugene H. Pearce (1895–1900)
11. John L. Weber (1901–1906)
12. Henry K. Taylor (1906–1909)
13. John J. Tigert (1909–1911)
14. James L. Clark (1911–1919)
15. William B. Campbell (1919–1924)
16. U. V. W. Darlington (1924–1925)

17. David C. Hull (1925–1928)
Interim Walter V. Cropper (1928–1929)
18. Clarence M. Dannelly (1929–1932)
19. Reginald V. Bennett (1932–1937)
20. Paul S. Powell (1937–1950)
21. John F. Baggett (1950–1951)
22. Oscar W. Lever (1951–1959)
23. Dr. Harold P. Hamilton (1959–1970)
24. William E. James (1971–1979)
25. Luther W. White (1979–1988)
26. Paul W. Hartman (1988–1993)
Interim Ray C. Purdom (1993–1994)
27. Wesley H. Poling (1994–2004)
28. Anne C. Federlein (2004–2008)
Interim Dr. M. Michael Fagan (2008)
29. Cheryl D. King (2008–2011)
30. W. Craig Turner (2011–2014)
31. Barton D. Darrell (2014–2019)
Interim Gene Tice (2019)
32. Thomas Mitzel (2020–)

Academics
Kentucky Wesleyan offers 29 majors and 13 pre-professional programs and has a student-to-faculty ratio of 13:1.  Academics are divided into four divisions: Fine Arts & Humanities, Natural Sciences & Mathematics, Professional Studies, and Social Sciences.

Campus 
Kentucky Wesleyan is located on 55 acres of land. Their campus includes buildings for academics, administration, student residence halls, and athletic facilities.

Academic and administrative buildings 

 Barnard-Jones Administration building, which houses the Office of Admissions and includes Tapscott Chapel and the Snyder Faculty Office building. 
 Winchester Campus Community Center, a student space that has meeting spaces, student organization offices, and the campus security office. 
 Hocker Family Dining Center/Greenwell Library and Learning Center, a large building that includes the dining hall, library, computer labs, student work spaces, and group and individual study spaces. This building connects to the Winchester Center for student ease of access. 
 Ralph Center for Fine Arts and Communication Arts, an academic building housing the majority of the Fine Arts and Humanities degree programs and the auditorium. 
 Yu Hak Hahn Center for the Sciences, an academic building that includes the majority of the Natural Sciences & Mathematics and some Social Sciences degree program classes.

Residence halls 
All residence halls have air conditioning.  Each residence hall room, unless designed as a private room, has two twin-size beds with mattresses, two dressers, two desks, two chairs and ample closet space. All residence halls are also equipped with Wi-Fi and laundry facilities. In addition, the campus is smoke-free.

 Massie Residence Hall, a suite-style residence hall featuring double and single rooms, semi-private bathrooms and community spaces.
 Peeples Residence Hall, which houses 140 people.
 Kendall Residence Hall, which houses 150 people. This is a newly renovated residence hall.
 Deacon Residence Hall, which houses ninety people.
 Stadium Drive Apartments, an apartment style residence hall featuring double and single rooms, living room, and semi-private bathrooms.

Athletic facilities 
The campus includes both student athletic facilities and athlete spaces.

 Jones Gymnasium/Woodward Health and Recreation Center, home to the practice facilities for the university's basketball teams and student health resources. 
 Panther Hitting Facility, where university baseball and softball teams practice. 
 Panther Park and Foster Field, where the baseball and softball teams compete. 
 Panther Field, where the soccer teams practice and compete. 
 Bullet Wilson Field at Steele Stadium, where the university's football teams practice and compete.

Student life
Kentucky Wesleyan offers over 40 student organizations on campus. These range from campus ministry, student government, Greek life, academic, and other special interest clubs.  Intramural sports are offered on a seasonal basis.

Governing organizations 

 Student Government Association (SGA), the self-governing body on campus that provides the student body with a voice in college affairs, ranging from administrative to social matters. SGA consists of an elected executive council and senate. Two senators represent each class. Elections are open to any interested student. 
 Panhellenic Council, the governing body for the national sororities on campus. It fosters cooperation, good will and harmony among the sororities, plans activities and administers policies and regulations governing Recruitment activities.
 Interfraternity Council, which regulates the affairs of the social fraternities, administers rules governing rush and pledging and encourages cooperation and harmony among its members.

Media and publications
 The Panogram — weekly student newspaper
 90.3 WKWC — 5,000 watt FM radio station run by students and volunteers

Greek life
Kentucky Wesleyan has three national fraternities and two national sororities.

Fraternities
 Sigma Alpha Mu
 Sigma Nu
 Sigma Phi Epsilon

Sororities
 Kappa Delta
 Alpha Omicron Pi

Campus ministries 
Kentucky Wesleyan, as a private Christian college, has strong ties to the local religious community. They have partnerships with twelve churches of various denominations as well as on-campus services and religious organizations.

Athletics 

The Kentucky Wesleyan (KWU) athletic teams are called the Panthers. The college is a member of the Division II level of the National Collegiate Athletic Association (NCAA), primarily competing in the Great Midwest Athletic Conference (G-MAC) as a founding member since the 2013–14 academic year. The Panthers previously competed as a charter member of the Great Lakes Valley Conference (GLVC) from 1978–79 to 2011–12 (but was fulfilling its commitments to the final year of competition for its other sports in the GLVC as a full member for the 2012–13 school year; before beginning competition as a full G-MAC member). They also competed in the Kentucky Intercollegiate Athletic Conference (KIAC; now currently known as the River States Conference (RSC) since the 2016–17 school year) of the National Association of Intercollegiate Athletics (NAIA) from 1916–17 to 1954–55.

KWU competes in 22 intercollegiate varsity sports: men's teams include baseball, basketball, bowling, cross country, football, golf, soccer, tennis, track & field (indoor and outdoor) and wrestling; while women's sports include basketball, bowling, cross country, golf, soccer, softball, tennis, track & field (indoor and outdoor) and volleyball; and co-ed sports include cheerleading.

Men's basketball
The men's basketball team advanced to the NCAA Men's Division II Basketball Championship Game six consecutive years (1998–2003), winning in 1999 and 2001 under the direction of Ray Harper. In addition to these successes, they won six other championships (1966, 1968, 1969, 1973, 1987, and 1990) and were runners-up in 1957. Overall, Kentucky Wesleyan has won eight NCAA Division II National Men's Basketball Championships, which is the most by any NCAA Division II School.

Notable alumni

Mohamed Abu Arisha (born 1997) - professional basketball player
 Keelan Cole - professional football player
 Urban Valentine Williams Darlington - former bishop of the Methodist Episcopal Church, South
 G. Lindsey Davis - bishop of the United Methodist Church
 Edgar Hager (1868–1935), criminal defense lawyer, Mayor of Ashland, Kentucky, and President of the Kentucky Municipal League.
 Ray Harper - college basketball coach
 John Wesley Hughes - founder of Asbury University and Kingswood College in Kentucky
 Joseph Jackson – assistant drama editor at The New York World and Hollywood screenwriter.
 Doug Moseley - Kentucky state senator and  United Methodist minister
 Paul A. Porter - former Federal Communications Commission chairman
 Stanley Forman Reed - former Justice of the United States Supreme Court
 Jody Richards - former Speaker of the House, Kentucky House of Representatives
 Roy Hunter Short - Bishop of The Methodist Church and the United Methodist Church
 A. J. Smith - Executive Vice President and General Manager of the San Diego Chargers
 Benjamin T. Spencer - scholar of American literature and professor at Ohio Wesleyan University
 Edward Lewis Tullis - bishop of the Methodist Episcopal Church, South and the United Methodist Church
 Cory Wade - professional baseball player

References

External links 
 
 Official athletics website

 
Educational institutions established in 1858
Buildings and structures in Owensboro, Kentucky
Liberal arts colleges in Kentucky
Universities and colleges accredited by the Southern Association of Colleges and Schools
Education in Daviess County, Kentucky
1858 establishments in Kentucky
Private universities and colleges in Kentucky